Liva may refer to:
 Līva (river), a river in Latvia
 Līva, former name of Liepāja
 Liva, Estonia, a village in Estonia
 Liva (album), a live album by Gåte
 Liva Weel, Danish singer and actress
 Liwa (Arabic), the Arabic alternative name for a sanjak, an Ottoman administrative division

See also
Light-induced voltage alteration, abbreviated LIVA